Ernst Scholz (3 May 1874 – 26 June 1932) was a lawyer as well a politician in the Weimar Republic. He was chairman of the German People's Party (DVP) proceeding the death of Gustav Stresemann and a member of the Reichstag from 1921 to 1930.

Early life and career
Born to a judicial council in Wiesbaden, Scholz graduated grammar school and pursued law as a career. He began his studies at the University of Freiburg and became a member of the Corps Suevia Freiburg, later moving to the University of Marburg. Finally, in 1895, Scholz graduated from Heidelberg University, thus completing his academic career and earning him a Doctorate in law.

In 1899, Scholz became a civil Assessor and in 1900, he became the First Secretary of the General Cooperative Association (Allgemeinen Genossenschaftsverbands) in Charlottenburg. He also travelled to Frankfurt in 1901 as a municipal assistant. Scholz was a veteran of the First World War, enlisting in the Reichswehr in 1914, getting wounded that same year and earning the position of major before retiring.

Scholz wrote about German mortgage law and the municipal taxation system in Prussia as well as authoring a legal book for cooperatives. From 1922 to 1929 he chaired the Professional Association of Senior Municipal Officials in Germany. He began his political career in 1919, joining the German People's Party (DVP), a party he remained in until his death. After the sudden death of long-time DVP leader, Gustav Stresemann, Scholz took over as president. However, he resigned in 1930 due to health reasons, being replaced by Eduard Dingeldey, who would remain leader until the party's dissolution in 1933.

Also active in many municipal governments, Scholz was the assistant minister and treasurer in both his birthplace of Wiesbaden (from 1902 to 1909) and Düsseldorf (from 1902 to 1912). From 1912 to 1913 he was the lord mayor of Kassel and from 1913 to 1914 and 1917–1920 he was the lord mayor of Charlottenburg, being the last person to hold that position in the city, as it was later incorporated in the Berlin. As a member of the "Lord Mayor Group" (OB-Fraktion), Scholz was a member of the Prussian House of Lords from 1912 to 1918.

On June 25, 1920, Scholz assumed the position of Reich Minister of Economics in the Fehrenbach cabinet until May 10, 1921. Scholz was then elected to the Reichstag in the East Prussia constituency (constituency 1) on March 7, 1921, where he remained until 1930. He retired from the Reichstag in 1930, presumably due to health reasons; this signalled the end of his political career and his life, he died at 58 the capital, Berlin.

Awards and honours
 Honorary Degree (Dr. -Ing. e. H.) in engineering
 Scholzplatz in Berlin-Charlottenburg (1931) dedicated to him (Scholz-platz)

References

German People's Party politicians
Members of the Reichstag of the Weimar Republic
Weimar Republic politicians
1874 births
1932 deaths